Alexandru Despa (born 31 March 2002) is a Romanian professional footballer who plays as a midfielder for Liga I club Rapid București.

Club career

Rapid București
He made his debut on 23 July 2021 for Rapid București in Liga I match against CS Mioveni.

Career statistics

Club

References

External links
 
 

2002 births
Living people
Footballers from Bucharest
Romanian footballers
Association football midfielders
Liga I players
FC Rapid București players